Stidham Farm is a 17.3 hectare geological Site of Special Scientific Interest near the town of Keynsham, Bath and North East Somerset, notified in 1991.

This site contains Pleistocene terrace-gravels of the River Avon. At least  of sandy gravels are recorded, consisting of limestone clasts mainly, but also with Millstone Grit, Pennant Sandstone, flint and chert clasts. The site is of considerable importance for studies relating to the possible glaciation of the area, and of the terrace stratigraphy, particularly as it is one of only two accessible terrace deposits in this part of the Avon valley.

References

Sites of Special Scientific Interest in Avon
Sites of Special Scientific Interest notified in 1991